In Kyo-don also known as "The Bear" (born June 27, 1992) is a South Korean taekwondo practitioner. He won the gold medal at the 2017 World Taekwondo Grand Slam on the heavyweight category.

Biography
He began to be interested in taekwondo after seeing a taekwondo kick demonstration in a local dojo during first year of elementary school.He was diagnosed with stage 2 lymphoma in 2014, which was completely cured in 2019.

References

External links
 

1992 births
Living people
South Korean male taekwondo practitioners
Universiade medalists in taekwondo
Universiade silver medalists for South Korea
World Taekwondo Championships medalists
Asian Taekwondo Championships medalists
Medalists at the 2015 Summer Universiade
Taekwondo practitioners at the 2020 Summer Olympics
Sportspeople from Incheon
Medalists at the 2020 Summer Olympics
Olympic medalists in taekwondo
Olympic bronze medalists for South Korea
Olympic taekwondo practitioners of South Korea
21st-century South Korean people